Rosa Valetti (25 January 1876, Berlin, Germany – 10 December 1937, Vienna, Austria), born Rosa Alice Vallentin, was a German actress, cabaret performer, and singer.

Biography 
Rosa Valetti was born in Berlin, the daughter of industrialist Felix Vallentin and sister of actor Hermann Vallentin. She played her first roles in the theatres of suburban Berlin. Inspired by the November Revolution and her meeting with political satirist Kurt Tucholsky, Valetti began performing in cabarets. In 1920, she founded the Café Grössenwahn ("Café Megalomania"), which has been recognized as one of the most important literary and political cabarets in 1920s Berlin. Café Megalomania was frequented by Expressionist writers, and the program of sketch comedy and political songs reflected Valetti's belief in the cabaret as an instrument of political and social criticism.

The inflation of 1919 to 1923 and the subsequent collapse of the German economy forced Valetti to close Cafe Megalomania. She directed the cabaret Rakete for a time, then launched another cafe of her own, the Rampe, which hosted the works of revolutionist poet and singer Erich Weinert. Valetti was among the founders of the floating cabaret Larifari during the late 1920s. In 1928 she performed as Mrs. Peachum in the original cast of Bertolt Brecht's Threepenny Opera, which was staged under the direction of Erich Engel at Berlin's Theater am Schiffbauerdamm.

Rosa Valetti acted in film roles from 1911. Her age and sturdy mien ensured that she acted mostly in motherly roles, as in the 1925 film Die Prinzessin und der Geiger (The Princess and the Violinist), in which she played a 46-year-old grandmother. In Josef von Sternberg's 1930 film Der Blaue Engel (The Blue Angel) she plays the wife of the magician, Kiepert (Kurt Gerron). Valetti also appears briefly in Fritz Lang's 1931 classic M as the proprietor of an underworld cafe.

In 1933, Valetti went into exile, performing first in Vienna and Prague, then in Palestine in 1936. She married actor Ludwig Roth and had a daughter, the actress Lisl Valetti, with him.

Rosa Valetti died in Vienna on 10 December 1937. She was buried at the Urnenhain.  The grave existed until 2001.

A street in Berlin's Mahlsdorf district is named "Rosa-Valetti-Strasse" in her honour.

Selected filmography 

 Frau Potiphar (1911)
 Die Ballhaus-Anna (1911)
 Wollen sie meine Tochter heiraten? (1914, Short)
 Kleine weiße Sklaven (1914)
 The Vice (1915) - Mutter
 Spiel im Spiel (1916)
 Rosa kann alles (1916)
 Die Gräfin Heyers (1916)
 Nicht lange täuschte mich das Glück (1917)
 Die toten Augen (1917)
 Othello oder: Das Verhängnis eines Fürstenhauses (1918)
 Wanderratten (1918, Short)
 Die lachende Maske (1918)
 Seelenverkäufer (1919) - Frau Houtton
 Die Geächteten (1919) - Maruschka Czapka, die Frau vom Wirt
 Madeleine (1919)
 Hang Lu oder: Der verhängnisvolle Schmuck (1919)
 Verlorene Töchter, 3. Teil - Die Menschen nennen es Liebe (1920)
 The Yellow Death (1920) - Awdotja
 The Dancer Barberina (1920) - Frau Campanini
 Narrentanz der Liebe (1920) - Wirtin
 The Girl from Acker Street (1920) - Mutter Schulze
 Kurfürstendamm (1920) - Frau Lesser
 Moral (1920)
 Respectable Women (1920)
 Christian Wahnschaffe (1920)
 The Guilt of Lavinia Morland (1920)
 Helmsman Holk (1920) - Greta Grien
 Die entfesselte Menschheit (1920)
 Die rote Katze (1920)
 Der fliegende Tod (1920)
 Der Dummkopf (1921) - Madame Schirmar
 The House on the Moon (1921)
 Hannerl and Her Lovers (1921) - Wahrsagerin
 The Three Aunts (1921)
 Das Mädchen aus der Ackerstraße - 3. Teil (1921)
 The Hotel of the Dead (1921)
 The Eternal Curse (1921)
 Die im Schatten gehen (1921)
 The Earl of Essex (1922) - Mrs. Cuff
 The Stream (1922)
 Carousel (1922)
 Die Schneiderkomtess (1922)
 Rudderless (1924)
 Zwischen Morgen und Morgen (1924)
 The Golden Calf (1925) - Frau Huber
 The Marriage Swindler (1925)
 The Flower Girl of Potsdam Square (1925) - Rieke Schulze
 Die Prinzessin und der Geiger (1925) - Michaels Grossmutter / Grandmother
 The Fire Dancer (1925) - Portiersfrau
 Oh Those Glorious Old Student Days (1925)
 The Woman without Money (1925)
 The Morals of the Alley (1925)
 Tartüff (1925) - Seine Haushälterin / Housekeeper
 The Ones Down There (1926)
 Accommodations for Marriage (1926)
 Tea Time in the Ackerstrasse (1926)
 The Captain from Koepenick (1926)
 Darling, Count the Cash (1926) - Heiratsvermittlerin
 Orphan of Lowood (1926) - Grace Poole
 How Do I Marry the Boss? (1927)
 Always Be True and Faithful (1927) - Fedora Bratfisch, Karussellbesitzerin
 The Transformation of Dr. Bessel (1927) - Die Wirtin des Hotel garni
 The Story of a Little Parisian (1928)
 Herkules Maier (1928) - Wirtin
 Spione (1928) - Kitty's Mother (uncredited)
 Gaunerliebchen (1928) - Alte
 The Burning Heart (1929)
 Asphalt (1929) - Frau an der Theke
 The Hero of Every Girl's Dream (1929)
 The Blue Angel (1930) - Guste, His Wife
 Täter gesucht (1931) - Nachbarin
 M – Eine Stadt sucht einen Mörder (1931) - Bartender
 Das Geheimnis der roten Katze (1931) - Laura Jefferson
 The Scoundrel (1931) - Frau Kochanke
 The Theft of the Mona Lisa (1931)
 The Adventurer of Tunis (1931) - Madame Rosa
 Marriage with Limited Liability (1931) - Frau Hollmann, seine Wirtin
 Ehe mit beschränkter Haftung (1931)
 Wiener Wald (1931) - Herself
 Two Hearts Beat as One (1932)
 Scandal on Park Street (1932)
 The Invisible Front (1932)
 The Dancer of Sanssouci (1932) - Mother
 Die unsichtbare Front (1933) - Tante Jenny
 Moral und Liebe (1933) - Frau Wronskaja
 Liliom (1934) - Minor Role (uncredited) (final film role)

Notes

Sources

External links 
 Rosa Valetti at filmportal.de 
 
 Photographs and literature

Actresses from Berlin
German cabaret performers
Jewish German actresses
German stage actresses
German film actresses
German silent film actresses
German musical theatre actresses
1876 births
1937 deaths
20th-century German actresses
Jewish emigrants from Nazi Germany to Mandatory Palestine